Sadak may refer to:

Places
 Satala, ancient Armenian settlement
 Manglaya Sadak, Indian town
 Sadak Arjuni, Indian town

Other uses
 Sadak (name), list of people with the name
 Sadak, Indian film
 Sadak in Search of the Waters of Oblivion, a painting by John Martin.